Softly, Softly is a British television police procedural series produced by the BBC and screened on BBC 1 from January 1966. It was created as a spin-off from the series Z-Cars, which ended its fifth series run in December 1965. The series took its title from the proverb "Softly, softly, catchee monkey", the motto of Lancashire Constabulary Training School.

Series outline
Softly, Softly centred on the work of regional police crime squads, plain-clothes CID officers based in the fictional region of Wyvern, supposedly in the Bristol area of England. It was designed as a vehicle for Detective Chief Inspector Charles Barlow and Detective Inspector John Watt (played by Stratford Johns and Frank Windsor, respectively) from the police series Z-Cars, which had just finished its original run in December 1965 (no new episodes were produced in 1966 but it was revived in a different format the following year). Joining them in the early series was Robert Keegan as Blackitt, the police station sergeant from Z-Cars, now retired and acting as a freelance helper.

The first two series continued the trend set by producer David Rose with Z-Cars and transmitted the majority of episodes live. This was one of the last long-running British TV series to do this. From series three onwards all episodes were pre-recorded.

Theme music
The original theme music was, like Z-Cars, a folk-song arrangement by Fritz Spiegl. It was released as a single (credited to the London Waits) on Andrew Loog Oldham's Immediate record label in 1966.

Series rundown

Cast

Others

Archive status
Many of the original Softly, Softly broadcasts are believed lost, especially from the first two series, the majority of which were transmitted live. As a result, 84 episodes are currently missing from the archives. (By comparison, all episodes of the follow-up Taskforce survive.)

Series and character development
In 1969, to coincide with the BBC's move to colour broadcasting on BBC 1, Softly Softly ended. The characters of Barlow, Watt and Hawkins were promoted and moved to the Southeast of England in a new series set in the fictitious town of Thamesford.  Here, as a result of changes in criminal activities, the police force needed to develop a new approach. Taskforces were set up: these were groupings of police expertise and manpower drawn together for special operations in the region. This was a new series in its own right and it was simply going to be called Taskforce. However, as it starred three strong characters from a popular "brand" that the BBC was reluctant to drop, this new series was retitled Softly, Softly: Task Force.

Stratford Johns left the Taskforce series in 1972 (Barlow had his own spin-off series Barlow at Large) and it continued until 1976 with Watt in command.

During the 70s Windsor also appeared as Watt in Jack the Ripper, in which he and Barlow reopened the Jack the Ripper murder casebook, and a similar series Second Verdict, in which they looked into unsolved mysteries and miscarriages of justice.

References

External links
 
 Softly, Softly at Television Heaven

1966 British television series debuts
1969 British television series endings
1960s British police procedural television series
1960s British crime television series
British crime drama television series
Black-and-white British television shows
English-language television shows
Lost BBC episodes
British television spin-offs